{{Infobox person
| name              = Kate Hood
| image             = 
| caption           =
| birth_name        =
| birth_date        = 10 October 
| birth_place       = Sydney, New South Wales, Australia
| occupation        = Actress, writer, director
| years_active      = 1981−present
| notable_works     = Prisoner (1986)
}}
Kate Hood is an Australian actress, born in Sydney. She studied drama in New Zealand and joined The Mercury Theatre.

She is best known to international audiences for her role in the cult television drama Prisoner as the misunderstood Kath Maxwell during the final year of the series.

She also played Jill Fowley on three episodes of Blue Heelers during its sixth season, and is the voice behind many TAC commercials. She had a part in the Jodie Foster film Mesmerized''.

In 2003, Hood was diagnosed with HSP (hereditary spastic paraplegia). She is a wheelchair user.

Filmography

References

External links

1950s births
Australian film actresses
Australian soap opera actresses
Australian stage actresses
Year of birth missing (living people)
Living people
20th-century Australian actresses
21st-century Australian actresses